Vărăncău is a commune in Soroca District, Moldova. It is composed of three villages: Slobozia-Cremene, Slobozia-Vărăncău and Vărăncău.

References

Communes of Soroca District
Populated places on the Dniester